Apprehension may refer to:
Apprehension (understanding), awareness or understanding of something by the mind
Arrest by law-enforcement officers
Fear
Anxiety
 Apprehension (film), a 1982 film by Lothar Warneke